The 1992-93 Austin Peay Governors basketball team represented Austin Peay State University in the 1992–93 season.

Schedule

|-
!colspan=9 style=| Ohio Valley tournament

Source

References 

Austin Peay Governors men's basketball seasons
Austin Peay
Austin Peay